Priyanka Dhillon (born January 24, 1993) is a Canadian minimum weight boxer. She competed at the 2022 Commonwealth Games, in the Minimum weight division, winning a bronze medal.

Life 
During her high school years, Dhillon was a track athlete at Sisler High School.

Dhillon was the first boxer from Manitoba to compete at the IBA World Championships.

References 

1993 births
Living people
Boxers at the 2022 Commonwealth Games
Canadian women boxers
Commonwealth Games bronze medallists for Canada
Commonwealth Games medallists in boxing
Sportspeople from Winnipeg
Medallists at the 2022 Commonwealth Games